Ingouville, also known as Ingouville-sur-Mer (literally Ingouville on Sea), is a commune in the Seine-Maritime department in the Normandy region in northern France.

Geography
The small northern border of the commune comprises huge cliffs overlooking the English Channel.

Population

Places of interest
 The church of St.Lubin, dating from the twelfth century.
 The nineteenth-century chateau.
 A sixteenth-century stone cross.

See also
Communes of the Seine-Maritime department

References

External links

Official commune website 

Communes of Seine-Maritime